The Broken Butterfly is a 1919 American silent drama film directed by Maurice Tourneur and starring Lew Cody, Mary Alden, and Pauline Starke.

Plot
While strolling through the forests of Canada, Marcène Elliot (Starke), a naive young woman meets Daniel Thorn (Cody), a composer looking for inspiration for a symphony. They are fascinated by each other and she abandons herself into her lover's arms. Daniel then writes a symphony and calls it “Marcène” after her. He then asks her to accompany him to "the old continent" for the first time, but she refuses, fearing the anger of her Aunt Julie Elliot (Alden).

Marcène gives birth to a little girl and then her aunt rejects her. Her own fears push her to attempt suicide. Upon returning, Daniel learns from Aunt Julie that Marcène gave birth to his child and that she drowned herself and her daughter. He then travels to forget his pain and meets Marcène's sister in England where she is playing his symphony. They get to know each other, finally fall in love and get married. Upon returning to Canada, they discover that Marcène and her daughter are still alive, but that Marcène lays dying in her bed. In agreement with his wife, they hide their marriage from Marcène. She dies happy and the couple adopts the little girl.

Cast
 Lew Cody as Daniel Thorn
 Mary Alden as Julie Elliot  
 Pauline Starke as Marcène Elliot  
 Peaches Johnson (this is probably Peaches Jackson)
 Nina Byron

Preservation status
A print of The Broken Butterfly is listed in the catalog of the French archive Centre national du cinéma et de l'image animée in Fort de Bois-d'Arcy.

References

Bibliography
 Waldman, Harry. Maurice Tourneur: The Life and Films. McFarland, 2001.

External links

1919 films
1919 drama films
Silent American drama films
Films directed by Maurice Tourneur
American silent feature films
1910s English-language films
American black-and-white films
Film Booking Offices of America films
1910s American films